Bình Xuyên is a rural district of Vĩnh Phúc province, in the Red River Delta region of northern Vietnam. As of 2003 the district had a population of 104,526. The district covers an area of 145 km². The district capital lies at Hương Canh.

References

Districts of Vĩnh Phúc province